The 1963 Constitution requires that all permanent agencies or commissions, except universities, be assigned to one of a maximum of twenty principal departments. The principal departments are the:

 Department of Agriculture & Rural Development
 Department of Attorney General
 Department of Civil Rights
 Department of Corrections
 Department of Education
 Department of Environment, Great Lakes, and Energy
 Department of Health and Human Services
 Department of Insurance & Financial Services
 Department of Licensing & Regulatory Affairs
 Department of Military & Veterans Affairs
 Department of Natural Resources
 Department of State (DOS)
 Department of State Police
 Department of Technology, Management & Budget (DTMB)
 Department of Talent and Economic Development (TED)
 Department of Transportation
 Department of Treasury

Type 1 agencies are under the under administration of the agency but operates independently of the principal department in caring out its function and in most cases created by a type 1 transfer.

Current units
 State Administrative Board (DTMB)
Civil Service Commission (DTMB)
Mackinac Bridge Authority (MDOT)
Mackinac Island State Park Commission
Michigan Lottery
Michigan Railroad Commission
Michigan Volunteer Defense Force
Michigan Occupational Safety and Health Administration
Customer Services Administration (DOS)
Department Services Administration (DOS)
Legal and Regulatory Services Administration (DOS)
Bureau of Branch Office Services (DOS)
Bureau of Driver and Vehicle Records (DOS)
Office of Customer Services (DOS)
Department of State Information Center (DOS)
Office of Technology and Project Services (DOS)
Office of Services to the Aging
Board of State Canvassers
Center for Educational Performance & Information
Center for Geographic Information
Children's Ombudsman
Community Service Commission
Economic Development Corporation
Bureau of Elections
Gaming Control Board
Geological Survey
Office of the Great Seal
Liquor Control Commission
Michigan Commission on Law Enforcement Standards
Michigan Employment Relations Commission
Michigan State Industries
Office of Retirement Services
Public Service Commission
Racing Commissioner
Records Management Services
Renewable Fuels Commission
State Budget Office (DTMB)
Office of the State Employer (DTMB)
State Housing Development Authority
State Office of Administrative Hearings & Rules
State Purchasing
State Transportation Commission
Tax Tribunal
Unemployment Insurance Agency
Women's Commission
Workers' Compensation Agency
Archives of Michigan
Michigan Council for Arts and Cultural Affairs
Office of Cultural Economic Development
Library of Michigan
Mackinac State Historic Parks
Michigan Film Office
Michigan Historical Museum
State Historic Preservation Office
Veterans Affairs Agency
State Officers Compensation Commission, responsible for setting salaries for Governor, Lieutenant governor, Supreme court justices, and Legislators with the seven Commissioners appointed by the Governor
Michigan Family Independence Agency, formerly Department of Social Services
Local Emergency Financial Assistance Loan Board

Former departments
 Michigan Department of Career Development
 Michigan Department of Commerce
 Department of Civil Service
 Department of Community Health
 Michigan Department of History, Arts and Libraries
 Michigan Department of Information Technology
 Michigan Department of Licensing and Regulation, abolished by Governor Engler with most of the department transfer to the Department of Commerce until Commerce was split up with the former L&R powers transferred to the Department of Consumer and Industry Services
 Michigan Department of Labor
 Michigan Department of Mental Health
 Department of the Michigan Jobs Commission
 Michigan Department of Public Health
 Michigan Department of Social Services

References

 
Agencies, departments, and commissions
Michigan